Philodendron pogonocaule is a species of plant in the family Araceae. It is endemic to Ecuador.  Its natural habitat is subtropical or tropical moist lowland forests. It is threatened by habitat loss.

References

pogonocaule
Endemic flora of Ecuador
Critically endangered flora of South America
Taxonomy articles created by Polbot